The Alma-Ata Children's Railway is a narrow-gauge children's railway in Almaty, Kazakhstan, which was called Alma-Ata from 1921 to 1993. It was inaugurated on 13 September 1952 as one of many pioneer railways in the Soviet Union and on 20 July 1997 it was temporarily decommissioned. Since 2006 it has operated as a ridable miniature railway for entertainment rather than an educational purpose.

History 
In the summer of 1952, the Pioneer Organization and the Komsomol of Alma-Ata built the  railway loop, a wooden platform, and a wooden station building in Alma-Ata's Central Park. Initially, the overhauled Kolomna type 63/65 locomotive UP-40 and two self-built wooden passenger carriages were used. The rolling stock was replaced in 1958 by a TU2 diesel locomotive and three Pafawag-built metal passenger carriages. The same year, a new building for the Section Manager and the dual track Komsomolskaya railway station were inaugurated.

Four PV40 (PV51) Kazakh railway carriages were acquired in the mid-1980s, and the diesel locomotive TU7A-2921 was acquired in 1986. Both railroad switches at the Komsomolskaya station were equipped with electric actuators in 1993. Pavlik Morozov station was renamed Dostyk (Kazakh for "friendship") and Komsomolskaya station was renamed Zhastar ("youth"). In 1995 wireless communication were installed between the stations and locomotives. The Kazakh government railway Kazakhstan Temir Zholy transferred the railway to the city council, which manages Central Park. The City Council suspended operations on the railway on 20 July 1997 due to commercial considerations. Within a month, the locomotive was vandalised and the carriages were removed from the track to be used as sales pavilions.

Current use 

Central Park was privatized in 1999, and the track and one of the stations was subsequently restored. The railway currently operates as a private enterprise using a miniature Italian diesel locomotive built to look like a steam locomotive with three open carriages. A fake tunnel that is too small for any of the traditional locomotives or carriages has been erected over the railway track. Prior to entering the tunnel, actors playing Native Americans sometimes pretend to attack the train. Inside the tunnel, the railway sometimes puts on a puppet show. At the end of August 2001, the wooden Dostyk station building burned down.

Cultural significance 
Russian railway enthusiasts complain that the Alma-Ata Children's Railway has changed from an educational organisation, where children and youths were educated to become future railway workers, to a conventional ridable miniature railway, where children are just customers and do not take responsibility for operating the railway. However, it is the only children's railway in Kazakhstan, and its operation and ridership have been stable since privatization.

References 

Children's railways
Railway lines in Kazakhstan
750 mm gauge railways in Kazakhstan
Railway lines opened in 1952
Transport in Almaty
1952 establishments in the Kazakh Soviet Socialist Republic